Jake Thomas Batty (born 5 April 2005) is an English professional footballer who plays as a left-back for Blackburn Rovers.

Club career
Born in Liverpool, Batty joined Blackburn Rovers in 2017. Having made his debut in a 4–0 EFL Cup win over Hartlepool United in August 2022, he signed his first professional contract with the club in October 2022.

International career
Batty has represented England at under-17 level.

Career statistics
.

Notes

References

Living people
2005 births
Footballers from Liverpool
English footballers
England youth international footballers
Association football defenders
Blackburn Rovers F.C. players